Douglas Lawrence Gott (born 30 June 1950 in Melbourne) is a former Australian sportsman who played Australian rules football for Collingwood in the VFL and cricket for Victoria.

A left footed defender, Gott also played several games as a centre half forward. He played in the drawn 1977 VFL Grand Final but didn't appear in the replay due to a cracked kneecap. It turned out to be a career-ending injury and he never managed another senior game.

Gott was also a talented cricketer and played in four first-class matches for Victoria in the 1973–74 summer and took nine wickets.

See also
 List of Victoria first-class cricketers

References

Cricinfo: Doug Gott

1950 births
Living people
Collingwood Football Club players
Australian cricketers
Victoria cricketers
Australian rules footballers from Melbourne
Cricketers from Melbourne
Ivanhoe Amateurs Football Club players